English Rose may refer to:

 English rose (epithet), an Englishwoman who is naturally attractive
 "English Rose" (cultivars), rose cultivars bred by David C. H. Austin
 Tudor rose, the traditional floral heraldic emblem of England

Music
 English Rose (album), an album by Fleetwood Mac
 "English Rose", a song by Motörhead from Motörizer 
 "English Rose", a song by the Jam from All Mod Cons
 "English Rose", a song by Ed Sheeran from x (Wembley Edition)

Other media
 The English Rose, a 1920 British silent film
 The English Roses, a series of children's books by Madonna

See also
 Tudor rose (disambiguation)